Walter Lima Jr. (born 26 November 1938) is a Brazilian film director and screenwriter. He has directed 17 films since 1965. His 1969 film Brazil Year 2000 was entered into the 19th Berlin International Film Festival, where it won a Silver Bear.

Selected filmography
 Black God, White Devil (1964 – writer)
 Brazil Year 2000 (1969)
 The Lyre of Delight (1978)
 Inocencia (1983)
 The Oyster and the Wind (1997)

References

External links

1938 births
Living people
Brazilian film directors
Brazilian screenwriters